"Yol" Pranvarin Chaichanakul  is a Thai-Nepali actress, currently residing in Thailand. She has been in the film business since she was 14 years old, and has been in a variety of commercials both in Thailand and in other countries including India and Myanmar. Pranvarin can speak three languages (Thai, English and Hindi). Yol Pranvarin is currently with BBTV channel 7 where she has been in over 15 TV series.

References

Yol Pranvarin
Living people
Year of birth missing (living people)